Abul Kashem is a Jatiya Party (Ershad) politician and the former Member of Parliament of Tangail-5.

Career
Kashem was elected to parliament from Tangail-5 as a Jatiya Party candidate in 2008. His parliamentary membership was cancelled in 2009 for being a loan defaulter.

References

Jatiya Party politicians
Living people
9th Jatiya Sangsad members
Year of birth missing (living people)